The 6th IAAF World Athletics Final was held at the Mercedes-Benz Arena in Stuttgart, Germany on September 13 and September 14, 2008.

A number of road races also took place on the second day of competition. There were seven different starting points around the Stuttgart area and the distances varied from 21 to 30 kilometres, with every race finishing in the Arena. Runners could join mid-race at specified times to allow for shorter distances and the aim was to have the runners finishing at a similar time. The road race ceremony was inspired by a similar event during the 1993 World Championships in Athletics, which was also held in the city.

Results

Men

Women 

Josephine Onyia of Spain was the original women's 100 m hurdles winner. She had tested positive for stimulant methylhexaneamine at the 2008 Athletissima meeting and also tested positive for Clenbuterol at the 2008 World Athletics Final, meaning her results were annulled.

The original discus winner, Yarelys Barrios of Cuba, was retrospectively disqualified due to a failed doping test at the 2008 Summer Olympics.

References

External links
Official 2008 IAAF World Athletics Final Site

World Athletics Final
A
International athletics competitions hosted by Germany
IAAF World Athletics Final
Sports competitions in Stuttgart